The Nigerian National Assembly delegation from Bauchi comprises three Senators representing Bauchi Central, Bauchi South, Bauchi North and twelve Representatives representing   Misau/Dambam, Zaki, Katagum, Bogoro, Gamawa, Jama'are, Bauchi, Darazo/Ganjuma, Ningi/Warji, Alkaleri/Kirfi, Shira/Giade, and Toro.

Fourth Republic

The 9th Parliament (2019 - 2023)

The 8th Parliament (2015 - 2019)

The 7th Parliament (2011 - 2015)

References

Official Website - National Assembly House of Representatives (Bauchi State)
 Senators List
 Legislators List

Politics of Bauchi State
National Assembly (Nigeria) delegations by state